Sonia Catalina Mercado Gallegos (born 23 October 1968) is a Mexican politician affiliated with the PRI. She currently serves as Deputy of the LXII Legislature of the Mexican Congress representing Durango.

References

1968 births
Living people
Politicians from Durango
People from Durango City
Women members of the Chamber of Deputies (Mexico)
Institutional Revolutionary Party politicians
21st-century Mexican politicians
21st-century Mexican women politicians
Deputies of the LXII Legislature of Mexico
Members of the Chamber of Deputies (Mexico) for Durango